The 2008 NASCAR Camping World East Series was the 22nd season of the Camping World East Series, a regional stock car racing series sanctioned by NASCAR. The season began on April 19, 2008, at Greenville-Pickens Speedway with the An American Revolution 150. The regular season concluded on October 12, 2008, at Stafford Motor Speedway. Matt Kobyluck won the championship, 210 points in front of Austin Dillon. Joey Logano entered the season as the defending drivers' champion, but he did not defend his championship because he moved up to the Nationwide Series in 2008.

It also marked the first season with Camping World as the title sponsor, which replaced Anheuser-Busch's Busch Beer after 21 years.

Schedule

* Races aired on delay only. All HDNet races aired live and re-aired on Speed.

Television
The 2008 television schedule followed a similar format to the 2007 season with almost all of the events having television coverage in one form or another. The first part of the season was broadcast on the Speed Channel via tape-delay.  HDNet signed on to broadcast the final seven races live. The U.S. Cellular 200 presented by Wellmark race at Iowa Speedway was shown live on HDNet due to the fact that it is a combination race with the Camping World West Series and it is part of the West Series' TV schedule.  The Toyota All-Star Showdown  moved to January and aired live on Speed.

2008 Races

An American Revolution 150 
The An American Revolution 150 presented by Kevin Whitaker Chevrolet was held at Greenville-Pickens Speedway on April 19. Peyton Sellers won the pole for the event and then went on to take the checkered flag in the first position.  During post-race inspection, an illegal shock absorber was found on Peyton's car and he was disqualified and was credited with a last-place finish in the race and everyone else in the field moved ahead one finishing position.  Austin Dillon crossed the line behind Peyton and was subsequently declared the winner.  This was Austin's first win in his first race in the series.

Did not Qualify: (9) Todd Peck (#50), Jason Cochran (#72), Richard Gould (#58), A. J. Henriksen (#17), Daniel Pope II (#10), Johnny Petrozelle (#33), James Pritchard (#41), Ian Henderson (#93), Joe Oliver (#08).

U.S. Cellular 200 

The U.S. Cellular 200 presented by Wellmark took place on May 18.  This marks the second year that the East and West series have met in Iowa for a points race.  Nextel Cup driver Kasey Kahne was on hand to take part in the event and marks the second time in a row that the winner of the previous night's "Nextel All-Star Race" was on hand for this event.  Austin Dillon captured his first pole award, and Brian Ickler captured his first win in the series.

Did not Qualify: (10) Michael Faulk (#36), Max Dumarey (#76), John Salemi (#63), Derek Thorn (#80), Jody Lavender (#89), Dustin Delaney (#39), Ryan Duff (#7), Richard Johns (#59), Lloyd Mack (#33), Ryan Preece (#28)

NOTE: On May 20, NASCAR announced that the No. 18 car of Marc Davis was found to be in violation of Sections 12-4-A (actions detrimental to stock car racing); 12-4-Q (car, car parts, components and/or equipment used do not conform to NASCAR rules); 20C-8.4C (lubrication oil reservoir tank cover was not in place on the top of the lubrication oil reservoir tank encasement) and 20C-2.1O (any device or duct work that permits air to pass from one area of the interior of the car to another, or to the outside of the car, will not be permitted. This includes, but is not limited to, the inside of the car to the trunk area, or the floors, firewalls, crush panels and wheel wells passing air into or out of the car) of the 2008 NASCAR rule book. The violations was discovered during post race inspection on May 18.

Strutmasters.com 150 
The Strutmasters.com 150 was run on May 31 at South Boston Speedway.  Ricky Carmichael took his first pole award and Brian Ickler went on to lead a dominant 149 laps of the Strutmasters.com 150. He then held off bids from runner-up Austin Dillon of Lewisville, North Carolina, and third-place Peyton Sellers of Danville, Virginia, through a late race caution that extended the event to 155 laps. This win was his second of the season, and his second in a row.

Did not Qualify: (9) Todd Peck (#50), Jason Cochran (#72), Richard Gould (#58), A. J. Henriksen (#17), Daniel Pope II (#10), Johnny Petrozelle (#33), James Pritchard (#41), Ian Henderson (#93), Joe Oliver (#08).

NOTE: This was Eddie MacDonald's 100th career start.

NASCAR Camping World Series 125 At The Glen 
The NASCAR Camping World Series 125 at The Glen was run on June 8.  This marked the return of the series to the historic Watkins Glen International track for the first time since 2004.  Antonio Pérez took the pole award and Matt Kobyluck went on to win the race. A green-white-checkered finish necessitated by a late-race blown engine and stretched the race from its scheduled 51 laps to 55. Marc Davis (No. 18 Slim Jim Toyota) led a total of 32 laps of the event and led the field to its final restart.

Did not Qualify: (2) James Buescher (#31), Larry Moloney (#89)

NOTE: The race was red flagged just past half-way due to rain.  The red flag lasted for approximately 90 minutes

Heluva Good! Summer 125 
The Heluva Good! Summer 125 was run on June 27 at the New Hampshire Motor Speedway.  This race is the first of three this season that will be run in conjunction with the NASCAR Nextel Cup series.  Qualifying was rained out and the field was set by the rulebook.  This put points leader Austin Dillon on the pole.  Matt Kobyluck went on to lead a race high 47 laps, but it was Eddie MacDonald taking the win after he managed to jump into the lead over Trevor Bayne on the final restart on lap 122.

Did Not Qualify: None

NOTE: This was Eddie MacDonald's first win at New Hampshire Motor Speedway in 16 career NASCAR Camping World Series East starts at the track.

Pepsi Full Fender Frenzy 100 
The Pepsi Full Fender Frenzy 100 was run on July 12 at the Thompson International Speedway.  Jesus Hernandez seemed to have the car to beat as he led three times for a race high of 50 laps, but it was Trevor Bayne who took both the pole and the win for the event.  This was Bayne's first pole award and his first win in the series in only his sixth start.

Did Not Qualify: (1) Guy Pavageau (#05)

Strutmasters.com 150 presented by Dollar General 
The Strutmasters.com 150 presented by Dollar General was run on July 19 at the Music City Motorplex.  Sterling Marlin was on hand to compete in this event.  Peyton Sellers captured another pole award and led a race-high 74 laps.  In the end it was Matt Kobyluck who crossed the start–finish line first to capture his second win of the season.

Did not Qualify: None

The Edge Hotel 150 
"The Edge Hotel 150" was run on July 26 at Adirondack Motor Speedway in Lowville (New Bremen), New York.  Bryon Chew captured his first pole award of the season and went on to finish eleventh, while Matt Kobyluck, who led for only three laps, went on to take the win for his third of the season and second in a row.  This was also Kobyluck's third win at this track in only six visits.

Did not Qualify: None

NOTE: NASCAR announced on July 29 that the #3 car of Austin Dillon was being penalized due to a rules violations discovered during post-race inspection.  The car was found to be in violation of Sections 12-4-A (actions detrimental to stock car racing); 12-4-Q (car, car parts, components and/or equipment used do not conform to NASCAR rules); and 20C-12.3-S (front shock absorbers would not extend to the specified distance within the specified period of time) of the 2008 NASCAR rule book. The violations were discovered during post race inspection on July 26.  The infraction dropped Dillon to 25th in the official race finish. All other drivers in the event moved up one position in the official finishing order.

Mohegan Sun NASCAR Camping World Series 200 
The Mohegan Sun NASCAR Camping World Series 200 took place on August 16 at Lime Rock Park in Lakeville, Connecticut.  This race is the second and final road course on the 2008 schedule.  Qualifying for this event was rained out so the starting lineup was set by the rule book.  This put points leader Matt Kobyluck on the pole for the event.  Matt went on to lead a race high 41 laps en route to win his 4th race of the season and third in a row.

Did not Qualify: None

Note: The race was red flagged at lap 51 due to rain. The red flag was out for 75 minutes before racing resumed.

Mansfield 150 
The Mansfield 150 took place on August 23 at Mansfield Motorsports Park in Mansfield, Ohio.  Trevor Bayne captured his second pole award of the season, while Brian Ickler dominated the field leading six times for 128 laps en route to his third win of the season.

Did not Qualify: None

Heluva Good! Fall 125 
The Heluva Good! Fall 125 took place on September 13 at New Hampshire Motor Speedway in Loudon.  "Independent" teams lead the field by taking the top three spots in qualifying on Thursday. Peyton Sellers, Steve Park and Eddie MacDonald took the top three spots respectively; Each of them drive for teams that have no affiliation with any Cup or Nationwide teams.  Rain on Friday forced the race to be postponed until Saturday morning.  A 52 lap green flag stretch during the middle of the race was not planned on and ended up resulting in several teams running out of gas in the closing laps.   Eddie MacDonald took the lead from Steve Park on the last lap and went on to win the race.

Did not Qualify: None

Note: Eddie MacDonald became the third driver to complete the sweep of the Camping World Series East events at NHMS.  Previous drivers to accomplish this feat are Mike McLaughlin in 1992 and Joey Logano in 2007

Sunoco 150 
The  Sunoco 150 was run on September 19 at Dover International Speedway in Dover, Delaware.  Points leader Matt Kobyluck was poised to clinch the series championship with good finish in the race.  Brian Ickler got his first pole position of the year but the race would turn bittersweet for him as he was involved in a wreck only 18 laps into the event.  A nine-minute red flag stopped the race for cleanup after an accident.  Aric Almirola would go on to win the race but it was Matt Kobyluck, who by finishing in third place and extending his lead to 219 points over second place with only one race remaining, clinched the series championship.

Did not Qualify: (1) Johnny Sauter (#12)

Notes: Aric Almirola became the second driver this year to win his first race in the series on his first start in the series.

Matt Kobyluck became the thirteenth different series champion in the series 22 years.

36th Annual Carquest Fall Final 
The 36th Annual Carquest Fall Final at Stafford Motor Speedway was originally scheduled to run on September 28; however, due to an unfavorable forecast the race was postponed until the weekend of October 11–12.

While Matt Kobyluck had wrapped up the series championship at Dover, there were still several positions within the top ten in points that were up for grabs.

Brian Ickler was the second to last driver to go out in qualifying and he laid down a lap of 19.376 seconds (new series record at the track) and took the pole.  Ickler would lead the first 36 laps of the event before handing the lead over to Ted Christopher on a restart.  Peyton Sellers would be the only other driver to lead laps during the race, and between the three of them they exchanged the lead 8 times.

A blistering race speed and a 57-lap green flag run put many cars down a lap and made for an exciting race.  A couple of late race cautions kept the leaders within reach of each other.  Towards the end of the race NASCAR was getting reports of Christopher's car leaking oil and spent several laps under caution looking for a leak but ended up not bringing him to pit road to take a look at the car.  On the final restart on lap 143 Ickler was leading with Christopher on the outside as they came to take the green flag.  The two got together and Ickler went spinning into the infield with Christopher taking the lead.

Ickler kept the car running and was able to continue but a caution was not thrown and the race continued under green.  Christopher and Sellers were running nose to tail for the lead. Coming out of turn 4 on lap 148 Ickler was directly in front of the leaders and Christopher seemed to have to check up a little bit to not get into Ickler.  This led to Sellers getting into the rear of Christopher and sending him spinning towards the outside wall.  Sellers would take the lead and the white flag as Christopher came to a rest near the wall out of turn 4.  The yellow came out and Sellers crossed the line in first place under the yellow/checkered flags and took the win.

Peyton Sellers would proceed to stop under the flag stand to get the checkered flag and do a little celebrating but all victory lane proceedings would be postponed while the tower reviewed the contact between Sellers and Christopher.  Fifteen minutes later word came from the tower that Sellers was the winner of the event.  This was Sellers' first win of the season after having a win in the season opener at Greenville-Pickens Speedway taken away from him for an illegal shock absorber.

Did not Qualify: None

Toyota All-Star Showdown 

The Toyota All-Star Showdown was moved to January of the next year from its traditional October date in order to allow the race to keep a "post-season" feel, this race is a 2008 Camping World Series race, per NASCAR rulebook, since it is run with 2008 rules, and not 2009 rules (e.g., 2008 approved equipment only;  no 2009 approved equipment was allowed to be run, and no 2009 rules applied).

The East-West showdown format favoured the West in qualifying, as six of the top ten drivers in qualifying were West drivers, with only two East Series regulars making the top ten, along with defending champion Joey Logano (who was not an East Series regular in 2008) and Mexico Series champion Antonio Pérez.

West Series champion Eric Holmes was among the leaders of the first 100 laps, along with East Series driver Brian Ickler (originally from California; moved to the Charlotte area to race in the East Series in 2008), who led 98 laps throughout the night.  Holmes dropped back because of a dragging part on the start of the second segment.  On Lap 141, Ron Hornaday Jr. ran into the side of Ickler, and caused an incident that led to a nine-minute red flag as 22 cars were involved, either by the crash or being stuck behind the wreckage.

On Lap 250, Logano raced Peyton Sellers, who has a Nationwide Series ride for 2009, hard, running into Sellers to cause a spin in turn three.  Logano crossed the line first but was disqualified by NASCAR for unsportsmanlike conduct.  East Series champion Matt Kobyluck, who did not lead a single lap and crashed in practice, going to his 2006 Showdown-winning car, finished second but was declared the winner.

East driver Trevor Bayne was second, and West driver Jason Bowles, who drove a car for this race purchased from East Series team owner Andy Santerre, who supported the team (he did not bring his regular team with him to the Showdown) was third.

There were 13 cautions in the race.

Did not qualify out of 50-lap "last chance qualifier" was held after qualifying.  The top six advanced.: (16) Blake Koch (#21), Joe Polewarczyk Jr. (#03), Daryl Harr (#00), Keith Spangler (#39), Brian Wong (#89), Marcus Zukanovic (#99), Tony Toste (#91), Stan Silva Jr. (#65), Paul Pedroncelli Jr. (#0), Billy Kann (#78), Kyle Kelley (#7), Dakoda Armstrong (#5), Wes Banks (#31), Rod Johnson Jr. (#04), Terry Henry (#19), Greg Pursley (#26).

NOTE:  Logano crossed the line first but was penalised for rough driving in the Lap 250 crash with Sellers.

Points standings 

* Denotes a rookie of the year candidate

Season-ending awards

See also
 2008 NASCAR Sprint Cup Series
 2008 NASCAR Nationwide Series
 2008 NASCAR Craftsman Truck Series
 2008 ARCA Re/Max Series
 2008 NASCAR Camping World West Series
 2008 NASCAR Canadian Tire Series
 2008 NASCAR Corona Series

References

External links 
Camping World East Series Standings and Statistics for 2008

ARCA Menards Series East